Fogle Peak is a distinctive pointed peak,  high, standing at the head of Kamb Glacier in the Royal Society Range of Victoria Land, Antarctica. It was named in 1992 by the Advisory Committee on Antarctic Names after Benson Fogle, Program Manager for Upper Atmospheric Research, Division of Polar Programs, National Science Foundation, 1976–85.

References 

Mountains of Victoria Land
Scott Coast